Ian "Ice Nut" Palangio (21 November 1972 – 2020) was a Canadian–Australian curler. He represented Australia at four World Curling Championships and was a two-time Pacific Curling Champion.

Palangio began curling in 1986. While living in Canada, he won the OVCA Mixed Bonspiel in 1998.

He worked for the Australian Curling Federation as board member and Federation's web site main editor.

Personal life
Palangio was born in Orangeville, Ontario. Outside of curling he was a software developer. He lived in Brisbane, Queensland and Narrabeen, New South Wales. He was married to Lisa and had two children.

Teammates and events

Men's

Mixed

Mixed doubles

References

External links

 Video: 

1972 births
2020 deaths
Australian male curlers
Pacific-Asian curling champions
Australian curling champions
Canadian expatriate sportspeople in Australia
People from Orangeville, Ontario
Sportspeople from Sydney
Canadian emigrants to Australia
Canadian male curlers
Sportspeople from Brisbane
Curlers from Ontario